Richard Broke was a Member of Parliament for Rochester in 1395.

References

14th-century births
Year of death missing
Year of birth missing
Place of death missing
Place of birth missing
English MPs 1395
People from Rochester, Kent